Ugen Tenzin is a Bhutanese politician who has been a member of the National Assembly of Bhutan, since October 2018. Previously, he was a member of the National Assembly of Bhutan from 2008 to 2013.

Education 
He holds a Master of Public Administration degree.

Political career 
Tenzin was elected to the National Assembly of Bhutan as a candidate of Druk Phuensum Tshogpa (DPT) from Bji Kar Tshog Uesu constituency in 2008 Bhutanese National Assembly election.

He later left DPT to join Druk Nyamrup Tshogpa and was elected for the second time to the National Assembly of Bhutan from Bji Kar Tshog Uesu constituency in the 2018 Bhutanese National Assembly election. He received 1,879 votes, defeating Sonam Tobgay, a candidate of DPT.

References 

1966 births
Living people
Druk Nyamrup Tshogpa politicians
Bhutanese MNAs 2018–2023
Bhutanese MNAs 2008–2013
Druk Nyamrup Tshogpa MNAs